The 1994 Oahu Open was a men's tennis tournament played on outdoor hard courts. It was the only edition of the Oahu Open, and was part of the World Series of the 1994 ATP Tour. It took place at the Turtle Bay Hilton in Oahu, Hawaii in United States, from January 3 through January 9, 1994. 

The singles featured Queen's Club runner-up, Sydney Indoor semifinalist and Antwerp doubles finalist Wayne Ferreira, Indianapolis and Vienna quarterfinalist Richey Reneberg, and Kuala Lumpur runner-up Jonas Svensson. Also competing in the draw were Beijing semifinalist Brad Gilbert, Bolzano champion Jonathan Stark, Fabrice Santoro, Renzo Furlan and Patrick McEnroe.

Finals

Singles

 Wayne Ferreira defeated  Richey Reneberg 6–4, 6–7(3–7), 6–1
 It was Ferreira's 1st singles title of the year and the 3rd of his career.

Doubles

 Tom Nijssen /  Cyril Suk defeated  Alex O'Brien /  Jonathan Stark 6–4, 6–4

References

External links
 ITF tournament edition details